The Port of Puerto Plata is located in San Felipe de Puerto Plata, Puerto Plata, Dominican Republic. This is the main harbor in the north coast and it is currently used for cargo operations and several military movements. Although the government is planning to rebuild the old terminal for commercial passenger operations.

Overview

The Port of Puerto Plata is the third most important port in the country. It has two terminals; one of them is currently being repaired by the government for tourism cruise operations, and it is known as Muelle Viejo.
The other is currently operating and it is called Muelle Nuevo.

This harbor operates container cargo, general cargo, fuel and tourist cruise management.

See also 
 List of ports and harbours of the Atlantic Ocean

Port information 
 Location: 
 Local time: UTC−4 
 Weather/climate/prevailing winds:  From May 15 until September 15. 
 Climate: mostly sunny, tropical. Hurricane season runs from June to November. 
 Prevailing winds: direction ENE–ESE.
 Average temperature range: 28–30 °C.

References 

 Port of Puerto Plata (Spanish)

Puerto Plata
Puerto Plata, Dominican Republic
Buildings and structures in Puerto Plata Province